Forever Amen is the third studio album from American singer and songwriter Steffany Gretzinger. It was released on March 27, 2020, through Provident Label Group. The album features appearances by Chandler Moore, Matt Maher, Amanda Lindsey Cook and Wonder Grace Gretzinger. Jason Ingram handled the production of the album.

Background
Following the release of her second album, Blackout (2018), Gretzinger had continued collaborating with Bethel Music, appearing on Moments: Mighty Sound (2018) and Bethel Music en Español (2019). She also collaborated with other worship artists, most notably featuring on Francesca Battistelli's single "Defender", as well as Travis Greene's "Good & Loved". In April 2019, Gretzinger announced that she would be leaving Bethel Music and Bethel Church to move to Nashville, Tennessee.

After moving to Nashville, Gretzinger partnered with Provident Label Group to release her third studio album. Forever Amen was announced by Gretzinger on Instagram the night before the album's release, saying:

Reception

Critical response

Timothy Yap of Hallels gave a positive review of the album, describing it as being "on the quieter side rifled with lots of slower and contemplative moments. Yet, what's the drawing power of the record is not in the tempo of the songs.  Rather, it's the way these songs have a way of drawing us together before the feet of Jesus."

Accolades

Commercial performance
In the United States, Forever Amen launched at No. 2 and No. 24 on the Billboard Christian Albums and Top Album Sales chart dated April 11, 2020. In the United Kingdom, the album launched at No. 4 on the Official Christian & Gospel Albums Chart dated April 9, 2020, published by the Official Charts Company.

Track listing

 Songwriting credits adapted from PraiseCharts.

Charts

Weekly charts

Year-end charts

Release history

References

External links
 

2020 albums
Steffany Gretzinger albums